Live in Villa Errera '95 is a live album by Catarrhal Noise.

Track listing
"Par Cunicio"
"Le scoasse"
"Cueo to mare"
"Tchintcheressa"
"Cuea"
"A cagada"
"Bisime & basime"
"Lento beco"
"Tutti chiavano (ma io no)"
"Aiuonadisoldepipol"
"Tukito Spich"
"Stufo, Agro, Monto"
"La damisgiana"

Catarrhal Noise albums
1995 live albums